Myzostomatidae is a family of polychaetes belonging to the order Phyllodocida.

Genera:
 Asteromyzostomum Vagin, 1954
 Cystimyzostomum Jagersten, 1940
 Endomyzostoma
 Hypomyzostoma Perrier, 1897
 Mesomyzostoma Remscheid, 1918
 Myzostoma Leuckart, 1836
 Myzostomites Clarke, 1921
 Notopharyngoides Fishelson, 1974
 Protomyszostomum Fedotov, 1912
 Pulvinomyzostomum

References

Phyllodocida